Anah Sport Club, is an Iraqi football team based in Anah, Al-Anbar, that plays in Iraq Division Three.

Managerial history
 Salih Hussein 
 Ayman Ahmed

See also 
 2019–20 Iraq FA Cup
 2020–21 Iraq FA Cup
 2021–22 Iraq FA Cup

References

External links
 Anah SC on Goalzz.com
 Iraq Clubs- Foundation Dates

1991 establishments in Iraq
Association football clubs established in 1991
Football clubs in Al-Anbar